Muhammad Rehan Hashmi (born 16 December 1973) is a Pakistani politician who was a member of the National Assembly of Pakistan from October 2012 to 2016.

Early life
He was born on 16 December 1973.

Political career
He was elected unopposed to the National Assembly of Pakistan as a candidate of Muttahida Qaumi Movement (MQM) from Constituency NA-245 (Karachi-VII) in by-polls held in October 2012.

He was re-elected to the National Assembly as a candidate of MQM from Constituency NA-245 (Karachi-VII) in 2013 Pakistani general election. He received 115,776 votes and defeated Muhammad Riaz Haider, a candidate of Pakistan Tehreek-e-Insaf (PTI).

In 2016, he resigned from the seat of the National Assembly to run in election of local government in Karachi.

References

Living people
Muttahida Qaumi Movement politicians
Pakistani MNAs 2013–2018
Politicians from Karachi
1973 births
Pakistani MNAs 2008–2013